Rose Bell Knox (born December 16, 1879 in Talladega, Alabama-July 1974) was an American writer of children's literature of the early to mid-twentieth century. Her books included The Boys and Sally, Miss Jimmy Deane, Gray Caps, Marty and Company, Patsy's Progress, Footlights Afloat, The Step Twins, and Cousins' Luck (1940).

Criticism

Although contemporary reviewers praised her work for its "cultural sensitivity," modern critics have called Knox's books "strikingly racist" because of their presentation of African Americans using racial stereotypes.

References

American children's writers
1879 births
American women children's writers
Year of death missing